The Iris Bay is a 32-floor tower in the Business Bay in Dubai, United Arab Emirates. The tower has a total structural height of 170 m (558 ft). Construction of the Iris Bay was expected to be completed in 2008 but progress stopped in 2011 and building is on hold. The reorganisation of the parent company in May 2012 has raised some hopes that work might restart. Construction commenced on the site in 2013 and completion is now expected in either late 2015 or early 2016.
 
The tower is designed in the shape of an ovoid and comprises two identical double curved pixelated shells which are rotated and cantilevered over the podium. The rear elevation is a continuous vertical curve punctuated by balconies while the front elevation is made up of seven zones of rotated glass. The podium comprises 4 storeys with a double height ground level and houses retail and commercial space totaling 36,000 m2.

The tower is also claimed to be environment-friendly.

See also 
 List of buildings in Dubai

Notes

External links
Emporis

Buildings and structures under construction in Dubai
High-tech architecture
Postmodern architecture
Skyscraper office buildings in Dubai